Brewster Hopkinson Shaw Jr. (born May 16, 1945) is a retired NASA astronaut, U.S. Air Force colonel, and former executive at Boeing. Shaw was inducted into the U.S. Astronaut Hall of Fame on May 6, 2006.

Shaw is a veteran of three Space Shuttle missions and has logged 533 hours of space flight. He was pilot of Space Shuttle Columbia in November 1983, commander of Space Shuttle Atlantis in November 1985 and commander of Columbia in August 1989.

Following the Space Shuttle Challenger accident in 1986, he supported the Roger's Presidential Commission investigating the accident. Shaw subsequently led the Space Shuttle Orbiter return-to-flight team chartered to enhance the safety of the vehicles’ operations.

Shaw worked as a manager at NASA until 1996 when he left the agency, retired from the Air Force and went to work in the private sector as an aerospace executive.

Early life and education
Shaw is the son of Mr. and Mrs. Brewster H. Shaw Sr. He was born May 16, 1945, and grew up in Michigan. He graduated from Cass City High School in Cass City, Michigan, in 1963. Shaw received a Bachelor of Science degree in Engineering Mechanics from the University of Wisconsin–Madison in 1968. He completed a Master of Science degree in Engineering Mechanics in 1969, also at UW-Madison.  Shaw joined the Delta Upsilon fraternity while attending UW-Madison.

While attending college Shaw was the member of a band called The Gentlemen. He credits his flying career to a fellow band member: “Our drummer, Steve Schimming, had a private pilot’s license, and one day he took me up in his plane. From that moment on, I wanted to be a pilot.”

U.S. Air Force pilot
Shaw entered the Air Force in 1969 after completing Officer Training School and attended undergraduate pilot training at Craig Air Force Base, Alabama. He received his pilot wings in 1970 and was then assigned to the F-100 Replacement Training Unit at Luke Air Force Base, Arizona.

In April 1973 Shaw reported to George Air Force Base, California, for F-4 instructor duties. Shaw attended the USAF Test Pilot School at Edwards Air Force Base, California, starting in July 1975. Following the completion of this training, he remained at Edwards as an operational test pilot. He served as an instructor at the USAF Test Pilot School from August 1977 to July 1978.

NASA career
Shaw was selected by NASA to be an astronaut in January 1978 where he served on loan from the Air Force.

Space flight experience

STS-9

Shaw's first trip to space was as pilot on STS-9 Columbia from November 28 to December 8, 1983.

His fellow crew included Commander John W. Young, mission specialists Owen Garriott and Robert Parker, and payload specialists, Byron Lichtenberg and Ulf Merbold. This was the largest crew to fly aboard a single spacecraft, the first international Shuttle crew and the first to carry payload specialists.

The crew conducted more than seventy multi-disciplinary scientific and technical investigations in the fields of life sciences, atmospheric physics and earth observations, astronomy and solar physics, space plasma physics, and materials processing. After ten days of spacelab hardware verification and around-the-clock scientific operations, Columbia and its laboratory cargo (the heaviest payload to be returned to Earth in the shuttle's cargo bay) returned to land on the dry lake bed at Edwards Air Force Base, California.

STS-61B

Brewster Shaw first served as shuttle commander on STS-61B Atlantis. The mission launched at night on November 26 and returned on December 3, 1985.

The crew included spacecraft commander Brewster Shaw; pilot, Bryan O'Connor; mission specialists, Mary Cleave, Jerry Ross, and Woody Spring; as well as payload specialists Rodolfo Neri Vela (Mexico), and Charles Walker (McDonnell Douglas).

During the mission the crew deployed the communications satellites, conducted two six-hour spacewalks to demonstrate space station construction techniques with the EASE/ACCESS experiments, operated the Continuous Flow Electrophoresis (CRFES) experiment for McDonnell Douglas and a Getaway Special (GAS) container for Telesat, Canada, conducted several Mexican Payload Specialists Experiments for the Mexican Government and tested the Orbiter Experiments Digital Autopilot (OEX DAP). This was the heaviest payload weight carried to orbit by the Space Shuttle to date. After completing 108 orbits of the Earth in 165 hours, Shaw landed Atlantis on Runway 22 at Edwards Air Force Base, California.

Brewster Shaw told the NASA oral historian for STS-61-B that he installed a padlock on the hatch control because he was “particularly concerned” that the Mexican Rodolfo Neri Vela could “flip out” during the mission. Shaw noted that he didn’t think that Neri Vela noticed the padlock at the time, but that other members of the crew did.

STS-28

Shaw was the commander of STS-28 Columbia (August 8–13, 1989). The mission included pilot Dick Richards and three mission specialists: Jim Adamson, Dave Leestma and Mark Brown. The shuttle carried classified Department of Defense payloads and a number of secondary payloads. After 80 orbits of Earth the five-day mission concluded with a dry lake bed landing on Runway 17 at Edwards Air Force Base, California.

NASA management
Shaw left the Johnson Space Center in October 1989 to assume the NASA Headquarters senior executive position of deputy director, Space Shuttle operations, located at the Kennedy Space Center. As operations manager, Shaw was responsible for all operational aspects of the Space Shuttle Program and had Level II authority over the Space Shuttle elements from the time the Orbiters left the Orbiter Processing Facility (OPF), were mated to the external tank and solid rocket boosters, transported to the launch pad, launched and recovered and returned to the Orbiter Processing Facility. He was the final authority for the launch decision, and chaired the Mission Management Team.

Shaw moved on to serve as the Deputy Program Manager, Space Shuttle, as a NASA Headquarters employee located at the Kennedy Space Center. In addition to the duties he previously held, he also shared with the Space Shuttle Program Manager, full authority and responsibility for the conduct of the Space Shuttle Program.

He then served as Director, Space Shuttle Operations, with responsibility for the development of all Space Shuttle elements, including the Orbiter, external tank, solid rocket boosters, Space Shuttle main engines, the facilities required to support mission operations and in the planning necessary to efficiently conduct Space Shuttle operations.

Aerospace executive

Rockwell and Boeing
Shaw joined Rockwell in 1996 after 27 years with the U.S. Air Force and NASA. The Boeing Company acquired Rockwell in December 1996.

Initially, Shaw served as director of major programs, Boeing Space and Defense Group. Then he became vice president and program manager of International Space Station (ISS) electrical power systems at Rocketdyne Propulsion and Power. The contract included the development, test, evaluation and production of the electrical power system to be assembled in space during multiple space shuttle launches. Shaw's next role was to lead the consolidated Boeing teams at Huntsville, Alabama, Canoga Park and Huntington Beach, California, in the design, development, test, evaluation, production and flight preparation of ISS hardware and software. Boeing was NASA's prime contractor and supplier for the ISS.

United Space Alliance
In mid-2003, Brewster Shaw left Boeing and became the chief operating officer of United Space Alliance (USA).  In that position he had primary responsibility for the day-to-day operations and overall management of USA, the prime contractor for the Space Shuttle Program, and its 10,000 employees in Florida, Texas, Alabama and Russia.

Return to Boeing
In January 2006 he returned to the Boeing Company's Houston campus, to serve as the Vice President & General Manager of the division which controls Boeing's International Space Station and Space Shuttle programs.

He retired from Boeing on August 26, 2011.

Personal life
He is married and is the father of three children. His youngest son, Brandon (born in 1976), was murdered by carjackers in Austin, Texas in July 1997.

Shaw is a descendant of William Brewster of the Mayflower.

Awards and honors
Shaw has earned numerous honors and awards including 28 medals in Vietnam. He received the Defense Superior Service Medal, the Air Force Distinguished Flying Cross with 7 Oak Leaf Cluster and the Defense Meritorious Service Medal.

References

External links

1945 births
Living people
Recipients of the Distinguished Flying Cross (United States)
United States Air Force officers
United States Astronaut Hall of Fame inductees
People from Cass City, Michigan
U.S. Air Force Test Pilot School alumni
University of Wisconsin–Madison College of Engineering alumni
Recipients of the Defense Superior Service Medal
United States Air Force astronauts
American chief operating officers
Space Shuttle program astronauts
Military personnel from Michigan